Andrew Silver may refer to:

Andrew Silver (producer) (born 1942), film director, writer and producer
Andrew Silver (speedway rider) (born 1967), former international motorcycle speedway rider
Casey Silver, real name Andrew Silver